Keyboard bass (shortened to keybass and sometimes referred as a synth-bass) is the use of a smaller, low-pitched keyboard with fewer notes than a regular keyboard or pedal keyboard to substitute for the deep notes of a bass guitar or double bass in music.

History

Early keyboard bass
The pipe organ is the first, and the forefather of keyboard bass instruments. The bass pedal keyboard was developed in the 13th century. The keys for the hands are also capable of playing very low pipe tones.

1960s

The earliest keyboard bass instrument was the 1960 Fender Rhodes piano bass, pictured to the right. The piano bass was essentially an electric piano containing the same pitch range as the most widely-used notes on an electric bass (or the double bass), which could be used to perform bass lines. It could be placed on top of a piano or organ, or mounted on a stand. Keyboard players such as The Doors' Ray Manzarek placed his Fender Rhodes piano bass on top of his Vox Continental or Gibson G-101 organ to play bass lines. About the same time, Hohner of Germany introduced a purely electronic bass keyboard, the Basset, which had a two-octave keyboard and rudimentary controls allowing a choice of tuba or string bass sounds. The Basset was in due course replaced by the Bass 2 and, in the mid-1970s, the Bass 3. All three were transistorized; the Basset was among the earliest solid-state electronic instruments. Similar instruments were produced in Japan under the "Raven" and "Rheem Kee Bass" (sic) names.

1970s and 1980s

In the 1970s, a variant form of keyboard bass, bass pedals, became popular. Bass pedals are pedal keyboards operated by musicians using their feet. The guitar players or bass players of bands such as Genesis' Mike Rutherford, Yes' Chris Squire, John Paul Jones of Led Zeppelin during acoustic sets, Geddy Lee of Rush, The Police (bassist Sting), or Atomic Rooster (organist Vincent Crane) use the bass pedals to play bass lines. Stevie Wonder pioneered the use of synthesizer keyboard bass, notably on "Boogie on Reggae Woman". Funk, R&B, G Rap and hiphop musicians such as George Clinton & Parliament, Funkadelic, Roger & Zapp, Dr. Dre, E-40, EPMD, and Kashif used synth bass. During these decades the keyboard bass in its original form was still in use by some bands such as the B-52's, who used a Korg SB-100 "Synth-Bass".

1990s-2020s

Starting in the 1990s, MIDI keyboard controllers, often the smaller 25-note models, are often used in some groups to play bass lines with virtual instruments, mostly synths and samplers. Keyboard bass instruments are a common alternative to bass guitars in rap, modern R&B, pop and in electronic dance music genres such as house music. MIDI keyboards used by bedroom producers and studio musicians alike, thanks to their affordability, portability, and the fact that they can be used to control multiple virtual instruments, rather than simply bass. As well, bassists from bands such as No Doubt sometimes perform bass lines on 25-note MIDI keyboards. Jack White of The White Stripes uses a vintage Rhodes Piano Bass live, particularly on performances of "My Doorbell". During Lady Gaga's The Monster Ball Tour, keyboardist and bassist Lanar "Kern" Brantley played synth bass on the Roland GAIA and Roland V-Synth.

See also
Bass pedals
Pedal keyboard

References

External links 

Information about early keyboard basses

Electric and electronic keyboard instruments
Keyboard instruments
Bass (sound)